Black Sheep is an Indian web series created by Stray Factory. The first season consists of eight episodes and premiered online on Rascalas.

Plot summary 
This coming of age show, chronicles the life of Shyam Rajendran a student at an engineering college who has trouble completing his degree. He decides to drop out and decides to become a Stand up Comic, much to the disapproval of his father, a Colonel in the army.

Cast 
 Shyam Renganathan as Shyam (8 episodes)
 Sindhuri Nandhakumar as Pratyusha (8 episodes)
 Vaishwath Shankar as Nikhil (8 episodes)
 Janaki Sabesh as Mom (5 episodes)
 Jeeva Ravi as Dad (5 episodes)

References

External links 
 

Indian television series
Comedy-drama web series